Banca Popolare di Crema is an Italian banking brand and former subsidiary of Banco Popolare.

History
Founded as Banca Popolare Agricola di Mutuo Credito in 1870, the Crema-based bank was later known as Banca Popolare di Crema. It became a subsidiary of Banca Popolare di Lodi (via sub-holding Reti Bancarie from 2003 to 2006) and then as a subsidiary of Banco Popolare since 2007. In 2011, Banca Popolare di Crema was absorbed by Banco Popolare, but retained as a brand, under banking division Banca Popolare di Lodi.

As at 31 December 2010, BP Crema had a shareholders' equity of €214.819 million.

References

External links
 

Banks established in 1870
Italian companies established in 1870
Banks disestablished in 2011
Italian companies disestablished in 2011
Companies based in Lombardy
Province of Cremona
Banco Popolare
Defunct cooperative banks of Italy
Italian brands